Provoleta is an Argentine variant of provolone cheese described as "Argentine pulled-curd Provolone cheese". It is eaten grilled in Argentina and Uruguay. It can be made on a grill, or indoors in a cast-iron pan. The cheese should be firm and able to hold its shape when grilled.

It was introduced in Argentina by Natalio Alba, a native of the Calabria region in Italy, who created this cheese inspired by typical cheeses of his region such as provola silana and caciocavallo, combining it with the tradition of Argentine asado.

The provolone, often topped with chilli and oregano, is placed directly on the grill, on small stones or inside a foil plate, and cooked until part-melted. The provoleta may be seasoned with chimichurri, a mixture of oils and spices, and is usually eaten communally with bread.

Stuffed provoleta is provoleta stuffed with assorted fillings that could include ham, barbecue sausage or morcilla blood sausage, cheese, vegetables, peppers and onions.

See also
 Cheese in Argentina

References

Argentine cuisine
Uruguayan cuisine
Barbecue
Cheese dishes
Argentine cheeses